Ronaldo Rubener Wanma (born 27 January 1998) is an Indonesian professional footballer who plays as a winger for Liga 2 club Perserang Serang.

Club career

Persipura Jayapura 
In 2018, Ronaldo Wanma promoted to the senior team. He made his debut on 24 March 2018, against Persela Lamongan in the first week  Liga 1. He signed in during the 61st minute to substitute Marcel Sacramento. And Ronaldo Wanma made his first goal in his debut on 75th minute second half.

Persik Kediri
He was signed for Persik Kediri to play in Liga 1 in the 2020 season. This season was suspended on 27 March 2020 due to the COVID-19 pandemic. The season was abandoned and was declared void on 20 January 2021.

PSM Makassar
In 2021, Wanma signed a contract with Indonesian Liga 1 club PSM Makassar for 2021 Menpora Cup.

Persikabo 1973
He was signed for Persikabo 1973 to play in Liga 1 in the 2021 season. Wanma made his league debut on 3 September 2021 as a substitute in a match against Madura United at the Indomilk Arena, Tangerang.

Career statistics

Club

Honours

Club
Persipura U-19
 Liga 1 U-19: 2017

References

External links 
 Ronaldo Wanma at Soccerway
 Ronaldo Wanma at Liga Indonesia

Living people
Papuan people
1998 births
People from Jayapura
Indonesian footballers
Association football wingers
Association football fullbacks
Persipura Jayapura players
Liga 1 (Indonesia) players
Indonesia youth international footballers
Indonesia international footballers
Sportspeople from Papua